List of Revenue Divisions of Tamil Nadu provides the revenue divisions and taluks of Tamil Nadu, a southern state of India.  These administrative units are classified based on the district.  There are 38 districts in Tamil Nadu and for revenue administration purposes, each district is divided into divisions, which are further divided to taluks.  Each of these taluks have a list of revenue villages under them. Tahsildar is the head of these taluks.

Developmental administration, in contrast, is carried out by panchayat unions (called blocks) in rural areas.  These panchayat unions have a set of panchayat villages under them.  In urban areas, the governance is done by municipal corporations, municipalities or town panchayats based on the size of the town.

Revenue administrative units

The list of revenue administrative units is as under

See also
 Districts of Tamil Nadu
 Government of Tamil Nadu
 List of developmental administrative units of Tamil Nadu

References

Revenue divisions